Kagarchi-Bulyak (Kügärsen-Büläk) is a rural locality (a selo) in Nizhnezaitovsky Selsoviet, Sharansky District, Bashkortostan, Russia. The population was 200 as of 2010. There are 2 streets.

Geography 
Kagarchi-Bulyak is located 36 km northwest of Sharan (the district's administrative centre) by road. Bukhara is the nearest rural locality.

References 

Rural localities in Sharansky District